Euchroaria is a genus of beetles in the family Buprestidae, containing the following species:

 Euchroaria coraeboides Obenberger, 1924
 Euchroaria subcornuta (Fairmaire, 1891)

References

Buprestidae genera